Two submarines of the United States Navy have been named USS Trepang, for the trepang, a marine animal having a long, tough, muscular body, sometimes called a sea slug or a sea cucumber, found in the coral reefs of the East Indies.

United States Navy ship names